Gibril is an Egyptian Arabic variant of Gabriel. Gibril is the Egyptian equivalent of the traditional Arabic transliteration Jibril. For an Islamic interpretation of Gabriel / Jibril / Gibril, see Gabriel#Islam.

Gibril is also a common Arabic given name and surname. Notable people with the given name or surname include:

Given name
Gibril Sankoh (born 1983), Sierra Leonean football (soccer) player
Gibril Wilson (born 1981), American football player of Sierra Leonean origin

Middle name
Musa Gibril Bala Gaye (born 1946), Gambian politician, economist, banker and diplomat

 Fictional entities
 Gibril, an Azure Striker Gunvolt 2 character

See also
Gabriel (disambiguation)
Jibril (disambiguation)